The women's 1500 metre freestyle event at the 2015 European Games took place on 25 June at the Aquatic Palace in Baku.

Results
The heats were started at 11:08 and 19:15.

References

Women's 1500 metre freestyle
2015 in women's swimming